The 2018–19 California Baptist Lancers men's basketball team represented California Baptist University during the 2018–19 NCAA Division I men's basketball season. They were led by head coach Rick Croy who was in his sixth season at California Baptist. The Lancers played their home games at the CBU Events Center in Riverside, California as members of the Western Athletic Conference.

This season was CBU's first of a four-year transition period from Division II to Division I. As a result, the Lancers were not eligible for NCAA postseason play and did not participate in the WAC tournament. They were eligible to play in the CollegeInsider.com Postseason Tournament or College Basketball Invitational. They finished the season 16–15, 7–9 in WAC play to finish in a tie for fifth place. The Lancers accepted an invitation to play in the CBI where they were defeated in the first round by Loyola Marymount.

Departures

Incoming transfers

Incoming recruits 
Adam Hess (6'5, Guard)
Glenn Morison (6'10, Forward)

Roster

Schedule and results 

|-
!colspan=12 style=| Non-conference regular season

|-
!colspan=12 style=|  WAC regular season
|-

|-
!colspan=12 style=| College Basketball Invitational
|-

Source:

See also 
 2018–19 California Baptist Lancers women's basketball team

References 

California Baptist Lancers men's basketball seasons
California Baptist
California Baptist Lancers men's basketball
California Baptist Lancers men's basketball
California Baptist